Harry Butterworth (22 November 1867 – 30 November 1954) was a British fencer. He competed in the individual and team sabre events at the 1912 Summer Olympics in Stockholm.

He was also the coach of Swedish football club Hammarby IF in 1920.

References

1867 births
1954 deaths
British male fencers
Olympic fencers of Great Britain
Fencers at the 1912 Summer Olympics
Hammarby Fotboll managers